The Komara government was the government of Guinea which took power after the December 2008 Guinean coup d'état under the direction of the National Council for Democracy and Development junta. This government ended on 26 January 2010 when Jean-Marie Doré formed a transitional government to oversee the country's first democratic elections, which were completed in November 2010.

Members 

The coup was carried out in December 2008 by the National Council for Democracy and Development following the death of the long serving president, Lansana Conté. The Council was headed by army Captain Moussa Dadis Camara. On 30 December 2008, Camara appointed the technocrat Kabiné Komara as Prime Minister.

On 14 January, a cabinet of 28 ministers was announced:

References 

Politics of Guinea
Political organisations based in Guinea